OpenVR is a software development kit (SDK) and application programming interface (API) developed by Valve for supporting the SteamVR and other virtual reality headset (VR) devices. The SteamVR platform uses it as the default application programming interface (API) and runtime. It serves as the interface between the VR hardware and software and is implemented by SteamVR.

Although OpenVR is the default SDK for HTC Vive, it was developed to have multiple vendor support. For instance, a developer can design OpenVR-based trigger button functions for controllers of Oculus Rift or Windows MR because these systems are both supported by the SDK.

Valve has announced that they will be cooperating with the Open Source Virtual Reality (OSVR) project, although the extent of the cooperation is unclear.

Initial Release 
OpenVR SDK was released to the public on 30 April 2015 by valve developer, for the developer to develop SteamVR games and software. It provides support for the HTC Vive Developer Edition, including the SteamVR controller and Lighthouse. This release is the next step toward the first major Developer Edition shipment.

The OpenVR SDK has replaced the API that was previously available in steamvr.h in the Steamworks SDK. The old API will continue to receive support indefinitely, but applications that require any of the new features must switch to the new SDK.

A number of new interfaces were added, and existing interfaces received new methods. Details can be found in the OpenVR API documentation.

With the new OpenVR SDK, software can now be connected to SteamVR hardware. The SDK can be downloaded from OpenVR github page. It supports all SteamVR products.

The SteamVR Unity Plugin and native SteamVR support in Unreal 4.8 have been implemented to support Unity in addition to the OpenVR SDK support. Both are available shortly after the OpenVR initial release.

Release Notes 
Changes from the SteamVR interface in SteamWorks SDK 1.31 to Initial release of OpenVR include

 IHmd is now IVRSystem
 Added support for multiple tracked objects.
 Moved fetching of various values about HMDs and other tracked devices into properties.
 Added support for providing applications with models and textures for tracked devices.
 Clarified and changed tracking prediction.
 Added origin to calls that return poses.
 Renamed IVRSystem::ZeroTracker to IVRSystem::ResetSeatedZeroPose
 Added angular velocity and velocity to the data returned with a tracked device’s pose.
 CAPI and C# bindings for OpenVR interfaces added to headers.
 Added IVRSystem::PollNextEvent to the API.
 Added new interface IVRChaperone to query chaperone hard and soft bounds.
 IVRSystem::GetHiddenAreaMesh. It returns the stencil mesh to use to minimize pixel rendering for the current HMD.
 Removed GetIPD. Use the property Prop_UserIpdMeters_Float instead.
 Added IVRCompositor interface

See also 
 OSVR, an open-source library with similar goals by Sensics, Razer and a community of partners and contributors
OpenXR, an open, royalty-free standard for access to virtual reality and augmented reality platforms and devices

References

External links 
 Official GitHub repository

Head-mounted displays
Virtual reality